Quicksilver Aircraft is an American manufacturer of ultralight and light aircraft. Founded in 1972 as Eipper Formance and later Eipper Aircraft, the company today claims to be the leading manufacturer of ultralight aircraft in the United States, with the Quicksilver type ultralight being used to train more ultralight pilots than any other type.

The company was previously known as Quicksilver Manufacturing Inc..

In October 2015, the company began a reorganization after a difficult year financially, closing its factory in California. Company sales had fallen and efforts to control costs were not successful without the reorganization and a liquidation of some assets.

Aircraft

GT400
GT500
MX Sprint
MX Sport
MX-2 Sprint
MXL-2 Sport
Quicksilver C
Quicksilver E
Sport II
Sport 2S

References
Citations

Bibliography

External links

Aircraft manufacturers of the United States
Temecula, California